Jacob J. Hecht (1924 – August 5, 1990), known occasionally as Rabbi JJ, was the assistant and translator of Rabbi Menachem Mendel Shneerson (the Lubavitcher Rebbe), and a leading Chabad rabbi, educator, writer and radio commentator.

Life 
Jacob J. Hecht was born Yaakov Yehuda Hecht in Brownsville, Brooklyn, in 1924. He was one of six brothers, all of whom became prominent Lubavitcher Chassidim. He received his rabbinical ordination from the Lubavitcher Yeshiva, and in 1947 was appointed head of Congregation Rabbi Meyer Simcha HaCohen in East Flatbush, a position he would hold for more than four decades.

Hect was married to Rebbetzin Chava Hecht (née Lasker) who was the longtime director of Camp Emunah in the Catskills. She died at the age of 95 in February 2022.

Achievements 
Hecht was the spiritual leader of Congregation Meir Simcha Hakohen of East Flatbush and for 44 years was the executive vice president of the National Committee for the Furtherance of Jewish Education. He was also dean of Hadar Hatorah Rabbinical College for Men, that he founded along with Rabbi Yisroel Jacobson, which was renamed Yeshivas Kol Yaakov Yehudah - Hadar Hatorah in recognition of his efforts and devotion to the Yeshiva and its students. He was also vice president of the Iranian Jewish Children's Fund and founder of the Ivy League Torah Study Program. He was also the founder of the Released Time Program of Greater NY.

Author 
He wrote two books: Brimstone and Fire and Essays on Judaism.

Lubavitch 
Hecht was the official translator for Rabbi Menachem Mendel Schneerson, the head of the Lubavitch Chasidic group, during his radio discourses in Yiddish, and was a commentator on radio station WEVD-AM. He was featured in Rabbi Chaim Dalfins Book about noted Chabad Chasidim in the 20th century

Camp Emunah 
In 1953, Hecht was encouraged by Rabbi Shneerson to purchase a facility and operate the first overnight Lubavitch children's camp in the world, Camp Emunah. Since its inception it has grown exponentially with more than 600 girls attending yearly it is more than a half a dozen different summer programs. Serving more than 100,000 girls over the last sixty five years.

Torah Scroll 
From 2008 to 2010 a Torah scroll was written in his honor.

Descendants 
Hecht had twelve children and more than a hundred grandchildren. Among the notable ones are:
Shea Hecht, Chairman of the Board of the National Committee for the Furtherance of Jewish Education, and a leading Chabad Rabbi
Aaron Raskin, founder of Congregation Bnai Avraham in Brooklyn Heights
Hanoch Hecht, also known as the 6 Minute Rabbi, is the spiritual leader of the Rhinebeck Jewish in Rhinebeck, NY and director of Chabad of Dutchess County

References 

1924 births
1990 deaths
20th-century American rabbis
20th-century American male writers
American Hasidic rabbis
Chabad-Lubavitch rabbis
Orthodox rabbis from New York City
Radio personalities from New York City
Writers from Brooklyn